CEMA or Cema may stand for:
CEMA = Council for the Encouragement of Music and the Arts, predecessor (1940) of the Arts Council of Great Britain
CEMA (European agricultural machinery), an agricultural machinery association in Europe
CEMA, The Council for Mutual Economic Assistance
CEMA (record label distributor), a branch of Capitol-EMI
California Ethnic and Multicultural Archives a repository of primary source materials from California's ethnic history
Centre d'Essais de Matériels Aériens, a French aircraft test centre at Vélizy – Villacoublay Air Base
Centro de Estudios Macroeconómicos de Argentina or Universidad del CEMA, a university  in Buenos Aires
Chef d'État-Major des Armées, the Chief of the Defence Staff of France
Committee for the Encouragement of Music and the Arts, the predecessor to the Arts Council of Great Britain
Consumer Electronics Manufacturers Association, now the Consumer Electronics Association
Japan Construction Equipment Manufacturers Association, a group which represents construction equipment manufacturers in Japan
 Civil Emergency Measures Act, a law in Yukon responding to the COVID-19 pandemic